
Ropczyce-Sędziszów County is a unit of territorial administration and local government (powiat) in Subcarpathian Voivodeship, south-eastern Poland. It came into being on January 1, 1999, as a result of the Polish local government reforms passed in 1998.

Neighbouring counties
Ropczyce-Sędziszów County is bordered by Mielec County and Kolbuszowa County to the north, Rzeszów County to the east, Strzyżów County to the south, and Dębica County to the west.

Administrative division
The county is subdivided into five gminas (two urban-rural and three rural). These are listed in the following table, in descending order of population.

References

 
Land counties of Podkarpackie Voivodeship